was a samurai in the service of Tokugawa Ieyasu. In 1601, Ieyasu gave Kazuaki the fiefdom of Zeze (30,000 koku) in Omi.

|-

Daimyo
1542 births
1604 deaths
Deified Japanese people